Pekka is a Finnish male given name. It was most popular around the middle of the 20th century. As of 2013 there were more than 100,000 people registered with this name in Finland. The nameday is the 29th of June in the Finnish tradition and the 25th of June on the orthodox calendar. It originated as a variation of the name Peter (Pietari).

Notable people with this name include:
Pekka-Eric Auvinen (born 1989), perpetrator of the Jokela school shooting in 2007
 Pekka Haavisto (born 1958), Finnish politician and minister
 Pekka Harttila (born 1941), Finnish diplomat and a lawyer
 Pekka Heino (television presenter) (born 1961), Sweden television host and presenter
 Pekka Heino (singer) (born 1976), Finnish metal singer
 Pekka Himanen (born 1973), Finnish philosopher
 Pekka Huhtaniemi (born 1949), Finnish diplomat
 Pekka Koskela (born 1982), Finnish speed skater
 Pekka Kuusisto (born 1976), Finnish violinist
 Pekka Lagerblom (born 1982), Finnish footballer
 Pekka T. Lehtinen (born 1934), Finnish arachnologist and taxonomist
 Pekka Lehto (born 1948), Finnish film director
 Pekka Leskinen (born 1954), Finnish figure skater
 Pekka Lundmark (born 1963), Finnish business executive
 Pekka Niemi (skier) (1909–1993), Finnish cross-country skier
 Pekka Niemi (weightlifter) (born 1952), Finnish weightlifter
 Pekka Pohjola (1952–2008), Finnish multi-instrumentalist, composer and producer
 Pekka Pyykkö (born 1941), Finnish chemist
 Pekka Rinne (born 1982), Finnish ice hockey goaltender
 Pekka Rautakallio (born 1953), Finnish ice hockey defenceman and coach
 Pekka Saarinen (born 1983), Finnish racing driver
 Esa-Pekka Salonen (born 1958) international orchestral conductor and composer
 Pekka Sammallahti (born 1947), Finnish professor of Sámi languages
 Pekka Tarjanne (1937–2010), Finnish scientist and politician

Fictional characters
 Pekka Puupää, Finnish comic and film character
 P.E.K.K.A. and Mini P.E.K.K.A., in the games Clash of Clans and Clash Royale

See also
 
 Ukko-Pekka

References 

Finnish masculine given names